Newport Center is the primary village and a census-designated place (CDP) in the town of Newport, Orleans County, Vermont, United States. As of the 2020 census, it had a population of 231, out of 1,526 in the town of Newport.

The CDP is in northern Orleans County, north of the geographic center of the town. It is in the valley of Mud Creek, a northwest-flowing tributary of the Missisquoi River, which flows west to Lake Champlain.

Vermont Route 105 passes through the village center, leading northwest  to North Troy next to the Canadian border and east-southeast the same distance to the city of Newport on Lake Memphremagog.

References 

Populated places in Orleans County, Vermont
Census-designated places in Orleans County, Vermont
Census-designated places in Vermont